The Pyralini are a tribe of snout moths described by Pierre André Latreille in 1809. They belong to the subfamily Pyralinae, which contains the "typical" snout moths of the Old World and some other regions. The genus list presented here is provisional.

They are deemed to represent the lineage around the type species, the meal moth (Pyralis farinalis), a somewhat notorious pest of stored cereals and similar goods. Like this species, Pyralini are usually largish snout moths; some are boldly colored (often in bright brown to yellow hues) by standards of their family.

Systematics and taxonomy
While the Pyralini are a successful radiation even as presently circumscribed, this delimitation is highly provisional. It is very likely that more genera belong here (unknown Pyralinae are still being discovered on a regular basis), and perhaps the group will turn out to be so large or phylogenetically inconsistent that it will be split apart. Pending a detailed analysis, the following genera are placed here (some notable species are also listed):

 Actenia Guenée in Boisduval & Guenée, 1854
 Actenia brunnealis
 Aglossa
 Amphiderita Turner, 1925
 Arescoptera Turner, 1911
 Arippara Walker, [1863]
 Arispe Ragonot, 1891
 Bostra Walker, 1863
 Cardamyla Walker, 1859
 Catocrocis Ragonot, 1891
 Curena Walker, [1866]
 Dolichomia Ragonot, 1891 (mostly placed in Hypsopygia)
 Essina Ragonot, 1891
 Fujimacia Marumo, 1939
 Gauna Walker, [1866]
 Gauna aegusalis
 Herculia (mostly placed in Hypsopygia)
 Hypsopygia
 Lixa Walker, [1866]
 Macna Walker, [1859]
 Mapeta
 Maradana Moore, 1884
 Micromastra Schaus, 1940
 Neodavisia Barnes & McDunnough, 1914
 Ocrasa (including Orthopygia, mostly placed in Hypsopygia)
 Perisseretma Warren, 1895
 Pseudasopia Grote, 1873 (mostly placed in Hypsopygia)
 Pyralis Linnaeus, 1758
 Pyralis farinalis – meal moth
 Pyralis manihotalis
 Pyralis pictalis – Poplar pyralis, painted meal moth
 Scenedra Meyrick, 1884
 Scenedra decoratalis
 Scenidiopis Turner, 1904
 Stemmatophora Guenée in Boisduval & Guenée, 1854
 Synaphe Hübner, [1825]
 Synaphe punctalis
 Taboga Dyar, 1914
 Tanyethira Turner, 1911
 Therapne Ragonot, 1890
 Trebania Ragonot, 1892
 Trebania flavifrontalis (Leech, 1889)
 Tretopteryx Ragonot, 1890
 Ulotricha Lederer, 1863
 Vitessa Moore, [1860]

Numerous Pyralinae genera have not yet been assigned to a tribe, and in general the subfamily is in need of thorough revision. Some genera have explicitly been allied with Pyralini genera in the past and might more likely than others be members of the present subfamily:
 Loryma Walker, 1859
 Scotomera Butler, 1881
 Tegulifera Saalmüller, 1880
 Zitha Walker, [1866] (including Tamraca)

Tanaobela is a more complicated case; it has by some authors been assigned to the grass moths (Crambidae, formerly included in the Pyralidae). Others have placed it in the Pyralini, which may well be correct.

Synonyms
The Pyralini have some objective junior synonyms due to misidentifications of specimens by early entomologists. In addition, presumed lineages around Aglossa, Mapeta (= Homalochroa) and Synaphe (= Cledeobia) were once considered taxonomically distinct, often even as subfamilies, but are today included in the present tribe. While they are not likely to be subfamilies, their actual taxonomic status will be determined by future analyses. The presently-obsolete synonyms of Pyralini are:
 Aglossinae A.Blanchard, 1840
 Asopidae Guenée, 1854
 Asopiinae Guenée, 1854
 Cledeobiinae A.Blanchard, 1840
 Homalochroidae Lederer, 1863
 Homalochroinae Lederer, 1863

Footnotes

References

  (2011): Markku Savela's Lepidoptera and Some Other Life Forms: Pyralinae. Version of 3 March 2011. Retrieved 29 May 2011.
  (2007): Phylogenetic studies and modern classification of the Pyraloidea (Lepidoptera). Revista Colombiana de Entomología 33(1): 1-8 [English with Spanish abstract]. HTML fulltext

 

Moth tribes